The men's individual road race at the 1976 Summer Olympics in Montreal, Quebec, Canada, was held on 26 July 1976. There were 134 cyclists from 40 nations starting the race. The maximum number of cyclists per nation was four. Fifty-eight cyclists finished the race. The event was won by Bernt Johansson of Sweden, the nation's first victory in the men's individual road race. Giuseppe Martinelli put Italy back on the podium with his silver; the nation had won gold or silver every Games from 1956 to 1968 but did not medal in 1972. Mieczysław Nowicki's bronze was Poland's first medal in the event.

Background

This was the 10th appearance of the event, previously held in 1896 and then at every Summer Olympics since 1936. It replaced the individual time trial event that had been held from 1912 to 1932 (and which would be reintroduced alongside the road race in 1996). Ryszard Szurkowski of Poland was "probably" the favorite; he had won the 1973 world championship and placed second in 1974. Neither the 1974 nor 1975 world champions competed in Montreal.  

Bolivia and Nicaragua each made their debut in the men's individual road race. Great Britain made its 10th appearance in the event, the only nation to have competed in each appearance to date.

Competition format and course

The mass-start race was on a 177.49 kilometre course "over the hilly Mont-Royal Circuit".

Schedule

All times are Eastern Daylight Time (UTC-4)

Results

The lead pack of 10 riders got clear during lap 6. Johansson broke away from the pack in the last lap for a clear win. In the final sprint by the remaining nine leaders, Thaler finished in front but was penalized for interfering with the other riders and demoted from second place to ninth (the back of the + 31" group, with Alfonsel falling behind the rest into 10th place).

References

External links
 Official Report

Road cycling at the 1976 Summer Olympics
Cycling at the Summer Olympics – Men's road race